Keith Steven Andrews  (born 3 May 1962) is a South African former rugby union player.

Playing career
Andrews completed his schooling at Selborne College in East London in the Eastern Cape, where played as a Flank. He also played Flank for the Western Province under–20 team after he moved to Cape Town to study at the University of Cape Town. He made his senior provincial debut for Western Province in 1985 as a Tighthead prop and spent 13 seasons with Western Province and was part of the Western Province team that won the Currie Cup in 1986 and 1997.

He made his test debut for the Springboks against England on 14 November 1992 at Twickenham in London. His last test match was the drawn test against New Zealand on 6 August 1994 at Eden Park in Auckland. Andrews played nine test matches and twenty–two tour matched for the Springboks.

Test history

Accolades
Andrews was voted one of the five South African Young Players of the Year for 1986, along with Martin Knoetze, Hendrik Kruger, Tiaan Strauss and Frans Wessels.

See also
List of South Africa national rugby union players – Springbok no. 574

References

1962 births
Living people
South African people of British descent
South African rugby union players
South Africa international rugby union players
White South African people
Western Province (rugby union) players
People from Enoch Mgijima Local Municipality
Rugby union players from the Eastern Cape
Rugby union props